Pedro José Alegría Soto (born 24 September 1951) is a businessman and politician from the Dominican Republic. He was Senator for the province of San José de Ocoa  and was elected in 2002, and re-elected in 2006; he has also been President of Lotería Electrónica Internacional Dominicana, S.A. (LEIDSA) —the largest private Dominican lottery— since its foundation in 1997.

Alegría has a Bachelor of Business Administration.

Pedro Alegría became the first senator elected from the Institutional Social Democratic Bloc after the 2016 general election.

References 

Living people
1951 births
People from San José de Ocoa Province
Dominican Revolutionary Party politicians
Members of the Senate of the Dominican Republic
Gambling people
White Dominicans